Andrej Poljšak (born 24 June 1968 in Koper) is a retired Slovenian football defender.

Poljšak was capped 15 times and scored 1 goal for the Slovenian national team between 1993 and 1998.

See also
Slovenian international players

References

1968 births
Living people
Slovenian footballers
Association football defenders
FC Koper players
NK Mura players
ND Gorica players
NK Primorje players
Slovenian PrvaLiga players
Slovenia international footballers